The Cetomimiformes or whalefishes are an order of small, deep-sea ray-finned fish. Some authorities include the whalefishes as part of the order Stephanoberyciformes, within the superfamily Cetomimoidea. Their sister order, the Beryciformes, includes the flashlight fish and squirrelfish.

Within this group are five families and approximately 18 genera and 32 species (but see below). Thought to have a circumglobal distribution throughout the tropical and temperate latitudes, whalefishes have been recorded at depths in excess of 3,500 metres.

Description
Named after their whale-shaped body (from the Greek ketos meaning "whale" or "sea monster", mimos meaning "imitative" and the Latin forma meaning "form"), the Cetomimiformes have extremely large mouths and highly distensible stomachs. Their eyes are very small or vestigial; the lateral line (composed of huge, hollow tubes) is consequently very well developed to compensate for life in the pitch black depths.

The dorsal and anal fins are set far back; all fins lack spines. The swim bladder is also absent, except in the larvae and juveniles which occur in the surface waters. Whalefish coloration is typically red to orange, sometimes with a black body. Some species possess light-producing organs called photophores; these are widespread among deep-sea fishes.

The largest known species reach a length of just 40 centimetres; most species are half this size. Sexual dimorphism is (apparently) exceptionally strong: males may only grow to 3.5 centimetres while females may be ten times as large. This is not uncommon among deep-sea fishes, with the males serving little use other than as suppliers of sperm: an even more extreme case are the parasitic males in deep-sea anglerfish.

Families 
Cetomimidae — flabby whalefishes
Rondeletiidae — redmouth whalefishes
Barbourisiidae — velvet whalefish (monotypic)

The gibberfishes (Gibberichthyidae) on the other hand, usually placed in the Stephanoberyciformes sensu stricto, appear to be close relatives of the Rondeletiidae and Barbourisiidae, as has been occasionally proposed.

Footnotes

References
  (2006): Fishes of the World (4th ed.). 
  (2001): Larvae and juveniles of the deepsea "whalefishes" Barbourisia and Rondeletia (Stephanoberyciformes: Barbourisiidae, Rondeletiidae), with comments on family relationships. Records of the Australian Museum 53(3): 407-425. PDF fulltext

External links
 Whalefish - Smithsonian Ocean Portal
 
 Aquatic community website 

 
Ray-finned fish orders